Bulgaria–Iraq relations (Bulgarian: Отношения между България и Ирак, Arabic: العلاقات بين بلغاريا والعراق) are the international relations between Bulgaria and Iraq. Bulgaria has an embassy in Baghdad and Iraq has an embassy in Sofia.

From 1944 until 1989 in Bulgaria's case and 1968 until 2003 in Iraq's case, both countries were non-electoral single-party autocracies.

In the 1960s, Bulgarian workers and advisors were sent to Iraq. In the mid-1960s there was a community of about 500 Bulgarians in Baghdad.

Bulgaria was part of the Multinational force in Iraq between May 2003 and December 2008. Initially, Bulgarian troops were stationed in Al Diwaniyah and had many losses. Those troops were withdrawn in late 2005. Shortly afterwards, non-combat troops were stationed to guard the Camp Ashraf.

See also 
 Foreign relations of Bulgaria 
 Foreign relations of Iraq
 Iraq–European Union relations
 Bulgaria–Iran relations

External links 
 Bulgarian embassy in Baghdad
 Bulgarian Ministry of Foreign Affairs: direction of the Iraqi embassy in Sofia

References 

Iraq 
Bilateral relations of Iraq